The first series of the British version of The Masked Dancer premiered on ITV on 29 May 2021, and concluded on 5 June 2021. The series was won by Olympic gymnast Louis Smith as "Carwash", with actress/dancer Bonnie Langford finishing second as "Squirrel", and singer Howard Donald placing third as "Zip".

Production
On 4 March 2021, it was announced that ITV were producing a local version of the American television dancing competition The Masked Dancer following the success of its sister show The Masked Singer. The series consisted of 12 contestants competing through seven episodes. The series was commissioned as a replacement in the spring schedule for Britain's Got Talent, which had its upcoming fifteenth series postponed until 2022 due to health and safety concerns surrounding the COVID-19 pandemic. The show premiered on 29 May 2021.

Panellists and host

Following the announcement of the series, it was confirmed by ITV that the panel would consist of presenter and comedian Jonathan Ross, television presenter Davina McCall, and comedian Mo Gilligan, who are all panellists on The Masked Singer, along with Strictly Come Dancing professional Oti Mabuse. It was also confirmed that Joel Dommett would host the show.

Guest panellists included David Walliams in the fifth episode, John Bishop in the sixth episode, and Holly Willoughby in the seventh episode.

Contestants
One of the shows sponsors, Lidl, had a product placement mask known as "Goose", who was unmasked to be Love Island winner Dani Dyer.

Episodes

Episode 1 (29 May)

Episode 2 (30 May)

Episode 3 (31 May)

Episode 4 (1 June)

Episode 5 (3 June)

Episode 6: Semi-final (4 June)

Episode 7: Final (5 June)
Group number: "Dancing in the Street" by Marvin Gaye

Ratings
Official ratings are taken from BARB, utilising the four-screen dashboard which includes viewers who watched the programme on laptops, smartphones, and tablets within 28 days of the original broadcast.

References

The Masked Dancer (British TV series)
2021 British television seasons